The Religious Sisters of Mercy of Alma, Michigan is a religious institute of pontifical right dedicated to the spiritual and corporal works of mercy. It was established in 1973 in response to the renewal called for in the Second Vatican Council. The Institute's Motherhouse is located in Alma, Michigan. It recognizes the Venerable Catherine McAuley as its original foundress.

History
In 1966, four Sisters of Mercy of the faculty of the Mercy College in Detroit studied Mercy Spirituality and identified ten constituent elements. In 1970, seven Sisters of Mercy formed an experimental community in Grand Rapids, Michigan, implementing these elements. On September 1, 1973 the group became a distinct Institute of Pontifical Right.

Description
The Sisters profess the vows of poverty, chastity, and obedience, as well as a fourth vow of service. They work predominantly in the apostolates of education and health care. As of 2015 the community numbers about 100 members and has houses in several states as well as Germany, Australia and Italy.

Sacred Heart Mercy Health Care Center (SHMHCC) is a non-profit Michigan corporation founded by the Religious Sisters of Mercy of Alma, Michigan.

Sister Mary Prudence Allen R.S.M. was among the 40 theologians and philosophers Pope Francis named to the International Theological Commission on Sept. 23, 2014. She is one of five women, and two Americans named to the commission that was set up in 1969 to advise the pope and Vatican on doctrinal issues.

See also
Sisters of Mercy

References

External links 
 Official site
 Tomasson, Robert E., "Church Scrutinizes 3 Groups of Nuns", New York Times, August 12, 1987

Catholic female orders and societies
Institutes of consecrated life
Christian organizations established in 1973